Port Coquitlam-Burke Mountain was a provincial electoral district for the Legislative Assembly of British Columbia, Canada from 2001 to 2009.

Demographics

Geography

1999 Redistribution
Changes from Port Coquitlam to Port Coquitlam-Burke Mountain included:
Inclusion of Douglas Island
Removal of Westwood and other areas in Coquitlam, east of Port Moody

History

Member of Legislative Assembly 

Its pre=eminient MLA was Mike Farnworth, who was also MLA for the area from 1991-2001. He represents the New Democratic Party of British Columbia. He served almost the entirety of the Riding's existence except from 2001-2005 when Karn Manhas of the Liberals defeated him in what was a landslide victory for the Liberals in that election.

Election results 

 
|NDP
|Mike Farnworth
|align="right"|11,844
|align="right"|48.14%

|- bgcolor="white"
!align="left" colspan=3|Total
!align="right"|24,605
|}

|-

|-
 
|NDP
|Mike Farnworth
|align="right"|7,198
|align="right"|32.65%
|align="right"|
|align="right"|$31,152

|Independent
|Craig Braconnier
|align="right"|151
|align="right"|0.68%
|align="right"|
|align="right"|

|}

|-
 
|NDP
|Mike Farnworth
|align="right"|14,767
|align="right"|46.37%
|align="right"|
|align="right"|$45,109

|-

|}

|-
 
|NDP
|Mike Farnworth
|align="right"|11,435
|align="right"|45.47%
|align="right"|
|align="right"|$22,300
|-

|}

External links 
BC Stats
Results of 2001 election (pdf)
2001 Expenditures (pdf)
Results of 1996 election
1996 Expenditures
Results of 1991 election
1991 Expenditures
Website of the Legislative Assembly of British Columbia

Former provincial electoral districts of British Columbia
Port Coquitlam